Multigenre Fan Convention Pyrkon (pol. Festiwal Fantastyki Pyrkon) (commonly known as Pyrkon) is a Polish fan convention held annually in Poznań on the first weekend after the spring equinox and dedicated to an integration of Science fiction fandom and a promotion of science-fiction/fantasy literature, comics, film, television, video games, RPG, LARP, board games, collectible card games and miniature wargaming. Pyrkon is the biggest event of this type in Poland and one of the biggest in Europe (over 55,000 people in 2022).

History
Pyrkon has been held by the Second Age Science Fiction Club (Klub Fantastyki "Druga Era") every year since 2000, except 2005 when they held Polcon. (In 2011 they organised both Pyrkon and Polcon.) Pyrkon has been a non-profit convention from its beginning, and all organizers, lecturers and gofers are volunteers.

Initially Pyrkon was held at the Dębiec district of Poznań in the following places
Elementary School nr 21 in Poznań [2000–2010]
Gymnasium nr 42 in Poznań [2008–2010]
Cezamet Hotel [2008–2010]
High and Technical Schools Complex nr 19 in Poznań [2010]
Due to the increasing number of visitors, in 2011 the convention moved to the present location, the Poznań International Fair and the Liceum ogólnokształcące nr 2 in Poznań (Liceum Ogólnokształcące nr 2 w Poznaniu).

On 6 March 1999, Second Age organised "Science Fiction Day" in the "Sun" District House of Culture in the Przyjaźni (Polish for friendship) district in Poznań. It was the direct predecessor of Pyrkon.

The tradition of holding Pyrkon on the first weekend after the spring equinox started in 2006. Usually it is also the weekend when Daylight saving time begins – participants are informed in a convention guide book and on posters of the need to adjust their timepieces.

Etymology
According to one theory, the name "Pyrkon" comes from the 10th Book of Pausanias' "Guide to Ancient Greece", where he quotes "Eumolpia", a hexameter poem attributed to Musaios, a son of Antiophemos, which states that Delphic Sibyl belonged to Poseidon and Gaia (Earth) in common, and that Gaia gave her oracles herself, but Poseidon used Pyrkon as his mouthpiece in giving responses.

According to the other theory, the name "Pyrkon" is derived from pyra ("potato" in Poznań's dialect) and the suffix -kon, which is added to names of all Polish fan conventions.

Program

Main Attractions
Pyrkon's goals are realized in
 meetings and discussion panels with science fiction and fantasy authors
 meetings with books and games publishers
 thematic lectures related to all spheres of science fiction
 popular science lectures, especially about physics, history, linguistics and cultural studies
 RPG sessions and LARP-s
 lending board games (Games Room)
 lending old video games
 board games, collectible card games and miniature wargaming tournaments
 demonstrations and premieres of board games, collectible card games, miniature wargaming and video games
 thematic competitions with prizes
 cosplay contest with prizes - The Masquerade

Other Attractions
The following also take place on Pyrkon:
 concerts
 fighting shows
 fireshows
 dancing shows and lessons
 karaoke and DDR contests
 Pyrkon Dance

Program Sections 
Attractions (lectures, discussion panels, meetings with guests, contests, concerts etc.) on Pyrkon are divided into thematic sections. Most attractions are held in Polish.

Pyrkon 2019 had 19 program sections, which are listed below:
 Integration Section – integration section is a zone to meet new friends and participate in integration games. There, you can strengthen ties with already known people, but also meet other participants with similar passions
 Film Section – lectures about films and film-making, amateur film shows, lessons of creating YouTube content
 Computer Games Section – computer games contests and tournaments, lectures about game design, creating Let's Play
 Literature Section – lectures and discussion panels about science-fiction and fantasy literature and meetings with authors
 Science Section – popular science lectures
 RPG Section – lessons on making good role-play sessions, presentations of new RPG systems, meetings with role-playing games creators
 LARP Section – LARP games, contest for best LARP on Pyrkon, presentations of LARP systems, lectures about making LARP costumes, improving larping skills
 Comics Section – lessons of comics drawing, meetings with comic book artists, lectures about comics
 Manga & Anime Section – lessons of manga style drawing, lectures about Japanese comics, animation and culture in general
 Contest Section – competitions about every part of pop culture
 Board Games Section – Games Room – presentations of new board games, games' rules lessons, lending board games
 Beginners' Section – short introductory lectures about every aspect of Fandom for beginners who have never visited any convention, played a board game, seen science-fiction film etc.
 Kids' Section – science-fiction and fantasy related attractions for children younger than 10 years old
 Exhibitions, Shows, Workshops – dance lessons and shows, concerts, Lego exhibitions etc.
 Fantasium Suburbium - The zone in which villages created by participants are related to the world of fantasy. There are, among others, handicraft workshops or fight and dance shows. From the groups exhibiting there, participants can hear a bit about reconstruction, as well as learn a bit of the armor creation, sewing or jewelry making
 Fantasium Creatium - A place where artists from all over the Poland exhibit their fantasy-related works. Both professional artists and beginners can submit their exhibitions. Inside the Fantasium Creatium there are, among others, science-fiction, fantasy, post-apocalyptic, handicraft and science zones
 Fantasium Ludicrum - The block, which includes stage performances - concerts and shows - and film screenings. The Fantasium Ludicrum performed, among others, Percival Schuttenbach, actors of the Poznań Musical Theater, there was also a performance of the "Ark" of the Theater of the Eighth Day
 Fantastic Initiatives Zone - The zone is intended for festival organizers and fantasy conventions from all over Poland. It serves as a place to meet, exchange experiences and make contacts with potential members of fantasy organizations. There are also smaller Polish fantasy events advertised there
 The Masquerade - One of the highlights of the program during Pyrkon is The Masquerade cosplay competition. Its participants compete in the categories: Best Cosplay, Best Own Project, Best Group Presentation and Best Solo Presentation. The main prize is the Grand Prix. In addition, the 2019 The Masquerade winner received the right to compete in the Cosplay Champions competition. The condition for joining The Masquerade is to create your own costume. It can depict a character known from the world of fantasy, but it must be made by hand. Each participant presents his disguise first only to the jury, which assesses whether the cosplay was really created from scratch. The Masquerade is traditionally held at the Earth Hall - the largest hall located at the Poznań International Fair. Due to the limited number of seats in the audience and the great interest of the audience, the show is also displayed on a large screen at the Fair, as well as broadcast live on Pyrkon's social media channels.

Foreign guests

Time and place

Awards

 contest of "The Convention Guide-Book" Web Portal (Informator Konwentowy): "The Best Fan Convention of the Season"
 Pyrkon 2006 – 2nd place (Winter 2005/2006 edition)
 Pyrkon 2007 – 1st place (Winter 2006/2007 edition)
 contest of "The Convention Guide-Book" Web Portal: "The Best Fan Convention of the Year"
 Pyrkon 2008 – 1st place
 contest of "The Convention Guide-Book" Web Portal: "Fan's Choice"
 Pyrkon 2006 – 2nd place (Winter 2005/2006 edition)
 Pyrkon 2007 – 1st place (Winter 2006/2007 edition)
 Pyrkon 2008 – 1st place (Year 2008 edition)
 plebiscite of "The Cathedral" Web Portal (Katedra): "Science Fiction" in category "The best fan convention or other SF mass event", in year 2012 simply "Event"
 Pyrkon 2007 – 1st place
 Pyrkon 2008 – 3rd place
 Pyrkon 2009 – 3rd place
 Pyrkon 2010 – 1st place
 Pyrkon 2011 – 1st place
 Pyrkon 2012 – 1st place

External links

 Pyrkon 2013 official website
  Pyrkon 2012 official website
  Pyrkon 2011 official website
  Pyrkon 2010 official website
  Pyrkon 2009 official website
  Pyrkon 2008 official website
  Pyrkon 2007 official website
  Pyrkon 2006 official website
  Pyrkon 2004 official website

References

Festivals in Poland
Science fiction conventions in Europe
Polish science fiction
Recurring events established in 1999
Spring (season) events in Poland